Georgiy Monastyrskiy (born 12 December 1997) is a Belarusian professional footballer. As of 2021, he plays for Hapoel Iksal.

References

External links 
 
 Profile at footballfacts.ru

1997 births
Living people
Belarusian footballers
Israeli footballers
Association football defenders
FC Gomel players
Ironi Nesher F.C. players
FC Belshina Bobruisk players
FC Lokomotiv Gomel players
FC Sputnik Rechitsa players
F.C. Tzeirei Kafr Kanna players
Hapoel Iksal F.C. players
Hapoel Bnei Ar'ara 'Ara F.C. players
Hapoel Bnei Fureidis F.C. players
Hapoel Migdal HaEmek F.C. players
Belarusian Premier League players
Belarusian First League players
Belarusian emigrants to Israel